Creve Armando Machava (born 8 February 1996) is a Mozambican athlete specialising in the 400 metres hurdles. He represented his country at the 2017 World Championships without reaching the semifinals. In addition, he won the gold medal at the 2017 Islamic Solidarity Games.

His personal best in the event is 49.54 seconds set in Marrocos in 2019.

He competed in the men's 400 metres hurdles event at the 2020 Summer Olympics.

International competitions

1Did not finish in the final

References

External links
 

1996 births
Living people
Mozambican male hurdlers
World Athletics Championships athletes for Mozambique
Commonwealth Games competitors for Mozambique
Athletes (track and field) at the 2018 Commonwealth Games
Sportspeople from Maputo
Athletes (track and field) at the 2019 African Games
African Games competitors for Mozambique
Islamic Solidarity Games medalists in athletics
Athletes (track and field) at the 2020 Summer Olympics
Olympic athletes of Mozambique